Leonard Gilchrist (5 September 1881–1958) was an English footballer who played in the Football League for Burton United and Derby County.

References

1881 births
1958 deaths
English footballers
Association football forwards
English Football League players
Burton United F.C. players
Derby County F.C. players
Coventry City F.C. players